Mandarina suenoae is a species of air-breathing land snail, a terrestrial pulmonate gastropod mollusk in the family Camaenidae. This species is endemic to Japan.

References

Molluscs of Japan
Mandarina
Gastropods described in 1978
Taxonomy articles created by Polbot